Narcís Serra i Serra (born 30 May 1943) is a Spanish economist and politician, serving as Deputy Prime Minister of Spain from 1991 to 1995. Born in Barcelona in 1943, he was one of the leading figures of Catalan socialism during the Spanish transition to democracy, and he was one of the founders of the Socialists' Party of Catalonia, the Catalan branch of the Spanish Socialist Workers' Party (PSOE).

Early life and career
Narcís Serra hailed from a Catholic family of Catalan origin. Prior to his political involvement, and before obtaining his PhD in economics at the Autonomous University of Barcelona, he worked as a research fellow at the London School of Economics from 1970 to 1972. He later became professor at the Autonomous University of Barcelona (where he taught Economic Theory). He is a Honorary Fellow at the London School of Economics.

Political career
Serra served as the first democratically elected Mayor of Barcelona after Franco's dictatorship (from 1979 to 1982). 

In the wake of the socialist victory in the 1982 Spanish general election, Serra was appointed Minister of Defense by Prime Minister Felipe González, and he succeeded Alfonso Guerra as Deputy Prime Minister in 1991. During his tenure as Minister of Defense, he promoted the legislative changes that resulted in the democratization of the Spanish armed forces, their effective integration in NATO structure, and the participation in international missions for the first time. He resigned as Deputy Prime Minister in 1995, but remained a Member of the Spanish Congress of Deputies representing the Constituency of Barcelona until 2004. He first gained his seat in Parliament in the 1986 Spanish general election.

Life after politics
In 2005, Serra was appointed president of Caixa Catalunya, a public savings bank. Following his resignation in 2011, he was tried for criminal mismanagement and abusive payments while he was chairman of the ailed savings bank. He was absolved of all charges in February 2019.

Serra has been the chairman of the Institut Barcelona d'Estudis Internacionals (IBEI) since its foundation in 2004. He currently teaches courses on Strategy, Military Reform and Peace Building as part of the Master studies offered by the institute.

Other activities

Corporate boards
 Telefónica Chile, Member of the Board of Directors

Non-profit organizations
 European Council on Foreign Relations (ECFR), Member 
 European Leadership Network (ELN), Senior Member

References

External links

1943 births
Living people
Politicians from Barcelona
Socialists' Party of Catalonia politicians
Mayors of Barcelona City Council
Members of the 3rd Congress of Deputies (Spain)
Members of the 4th Congress of Deputies (Spain)
Members of the 5th Congress of Deputies (Spain)
Members of the 6th Congress of Deputies (Spain)
Members of the 7th Congress of Deputies (Spain)
Deputy Prime Ministers of Spain
Defence ministers of Spain
Honorary Fellows of the London School of Economics
Public works ministers of Catalonia